Giovanna Francesca Michelotti (29 August 1843 – 1 February 1888), born Anna Michelotti, was an Italian religious sister. Upon her investiture, Michelotti assumed the name Giovanna Francesca. She established a new religious congregation which she named the Little Servants of the Sacred Heart of Jesus for the Sick Poor. She was beatified on 1 November 1975.

Life
Anna Michelotti was born on 29 August 1843 in Annecy, Kingdom of Sardinia (today France) and remained fatherless as a child. She had at least one brother. She lived in a poor state and despite this she grew in her faith as well as her undivided attention to the plight of all of those who were poor. This marked the beginning of her calling to religious life.

Michelotti travelled across France for her studies at the Institute of the Sisters of Saint Charles and she asked to enter their novitiate. Despite this, her path was elsewhere. In 1863 she was left alone with the death of her mother and her brother Antonio. She went to her paternal relatives in Almese and later went to Turin. It was there in 1874 that she donned the habit for the first time and made her solemn profession. 

To work with the poor and the sick she - in 1875 - established a new congregation in order to devote efforts to them alone. She served as a teacher for a brief period of time and spent her time at the tomb of Francis de Sales. She used her free time to read and meditate on sacred scripture and would work in spreading the message of Jesus Christ across to the poor as well as bringing to them the sacraments. Before she made major decisions she sought the advice of confessors such as John Bosco.

Michelotti died in 1888 after a long period of ill health in the form of bronchial asthma.

Beatification
The beatification process commenced in Turin in 1933 and it concluded its work on 24 October 1935 despite the fact that the formal introduction of the cause was not until 6 December 1942 under Pope Pius XII which gave her the title Servant of God. The second process opened also in Turin and spanned from 1946 until 1947; both processes were granted the formal decree of ratification in 1952 for the cause to proceed to Rome for further evaluation.

On 15 December 1966 her life of heroic virtue was recognized and it allowed for Pope Paul VI to declare her to be Venerable. He also approved a miracle almost a decade later and beatified her on 1 November 1975.

References

External links
Hagiography Circle

1843 births
1888 deaths
19th-century venerated Christians
19th-century Italian Roman Catholic religious sisters and nuns
Founders of Catholic religious communities
Italian beatified people